Parveen Hayat (In Arabic/Urdu:  پروین حیات ) became the first female to serve as city president of the Pakistan People’s Party in Lahore, Pakistan, During the exile of the party leader Benazir Bhutto. She also holds the title of the longest serving female city president since. She herself assumed exile in London, England in 2002. Although no longer active in politics unlike her collouges Naheed Khan and Dr. Safdar Abbasi, she is still recognized as a party elder. She is the only sister of Fazal Ahmad, Sultan Ahmad, Munir Ahmad and Ashraf Bilal.

External links
 Website

Living people
Politicians from Lahore
Pakistan People's Party politicians
Year of birth missing (living people)